Rajendra Kumar Gupta was a leader of Bharatiya Janata Party from Uttar Pradesh. He was president of the Uttar Pradesh state unit of the party. He was a member of Uttar Pradesh Legislative Assembly from Sitapur and served as cabinet minister holding finance portfolio in Kalyan Singh ministry. He died in 2003.

References

2003 deaths
State cabinet ministers of Uttar Pradesh
People from Sitapur district
Uttar Pradesh MLAs 1977–1980
Bharatiya Janata Party politicians from Uttar Pradesh
1936 births